Zhob River is located in Balochistan and Khyber Pakhtunkhwa, Pakistan. The total length of the Zhob River is 410 km, and it flows on a generally northeasterly course.

Etymology
In the Pashto language, Zhob means "oozing water". Linguistically the name is Irano-Aryan in origin and compares etymologically to those of the Little Zab and Great Zab rivers in the Tigris Basin.

Course
The Zhob River originates in the Kan Mehtarzai range (Tsari Mehtarzai Pass) near Muslim Bagh. It passes about 4 km west of the city of Zhob. As a tributary of the Gomal River, which it joins near Khajuri Kach, it forms a part of the Indus River Basin.

Agriculture
The Zhob River is used to irrigate the land in northern Balochistan along with the Gomal River, making the fertile soil available for agriculture. Although in the 1960s and 1970s degradation of the channel of the Zhob decreased the irrigable acreage.

Archaeology 
Along the Zhob River there are located the ancient sites of Rana Ghundai, Periano Ghundai, Rehman Dheri, along with the nearby site of Gumla, which go before 3000 BC.

References

Zhob District
Rivers of Balochistan (Pakistan)
Rivers of Khyber Pakhtunkhwa
Indus basin
Rivers of Pakistan